Elric! is a roleplaying game published by Chaosium in 1993.

Description
Elric! (1993) was designed by Lynn Willis, Richard Watts, Mark Morrison, Jimmie W. Pursell Jr., Sam Shirley, and Joshua Shaw; book; cover art by Brunner (same as 2nd edition of Stormbringer). The purpose of the "!" was to distinguish the role-playing game from the Elric board game published by Chaosium in 1978 and subsequently by Hobby Japan in 1981 and Avalon Hill in 1984.

Translations
 Japanese edition (1993), soft-cover, published by Hobby Japan, cover art by Yasushi Nirasawa
 French edition (1994), hardback, published by Oriflam, cover art by Hubert de Lartigue
 Spanish edition (October 1997), soft-cover, published by Joc Internacional as Elric, without any exclamation mark, cover art by Frank Brunner

System
Elric! was a substantial reworking of the Stormbringer game, and version 5 is a new layout of the Elric! rules, with additional material from several older game supplements that are no longer in print.

Publication history
Shannon Appelcline noted that Chaosium started working on major new role-playing systems at the same time it was entering the fiction field, and for the first time in nearly a decade: "The first was Elric! (1993), a totally new BRP vision of the Young Kingdoms, meant to replace the venerable Stormbringer. Richard Watts and Lynn Willis — the latter fresh from a major overhaul of the Call of Cthulhu rules — were the new game's creators. The new system was cleaner and more balanced. It also downplayed demons and increased the role of common magic — perhaps making it more accessible, particularly in Middle America."

Appelcline explained that Chaosium took a substantial loss on Mythos, and "Chaosium responded by shutting down several of its lines, this time Pendragon, Elric!, Nephilim, and Mythos itself." Appelcline added that "Chaosium also participated in the d20 explosion, though in a fairly minimum way. While re-releasing the Elric! rules as Stormbringer fifth edition (2001), they also published a d20 version of the game called Dragon Lords of Melniboné (2001)."

Reviews
White Wolf #39 (1994)

References

External links 
Elric! at RPGnet
Elric! at RPGGeek

Basic Role-Playing System
Dark fantasy role-playing games
Lynn Willis games
Michael Moorcock's Multiverse
Role-playing games based on novels
Role-playing games introduced in 1993